The Roman Empire usually refers to the post-republican, autocratic government period of Roman civilization, centered on the city of Rome on the Italian peninsula from 27 BC to 330 AD, and in Constantinople on the Bosporus from 330 to 1453 AD.

Roman Empire may also refer to:
Ancient Rome (753 BC–476 AD), the entire period of ancient Roman civilization, including the Kingdom, Republic and part of the Imperial periods
Kingdom of Rome (753 BC–509 BC), the poorly known earliest stage of Roman civilization
Roman Republic (509 BC–27 BC), the period of the ancient Roman civilization when its government operated as a republic
The two administrative divisions of the empire during the late imperial period:
Eastern Roman Empire (395–1453), also known as the Byzantine Empire, the eastern half of the Roman Empire, juridically simply the "Roman Empire" after 480 AD
Western Roman Empire (395–476/480), the western half of the Roman Empire

Other uses
Roman Empire: Reign of Blood, 2016 American documentary television series

See also
Roman's Empire, a comedy television show on BBC Two
The Fall of the Roman Empire (film), a 1964 epic film by Paramount Pictures
Rome (disambiguation)
Roman Republic (disambiguation)
Ancient Rome (disambiguation)
Decline and fall of the Roman Empire (disambiguation)
History of Rome
Decline of the Roman Empire
Fall of the Western Roman Empire